
Year 165 BC was a year of the pre-Julian Roman calendar. At the time it was known as the Year of the Consulship of Torquatus and Octavius (or, less frequently, year 589 Ab urbe condita). The denomination 165 BC for this year has been used since the early medieval period, when the Anno Domini calendar era became the prevalent method in Europe for naming years.

Events 
 By place 

 Seleucid Empire 
 Artaxias I, king of Armenia, is taken captive by the Seleucid king Antiochus IV Epiphanes when he attacks Armenia. Artaxias is forced to recognize Antiochus IV's suzerainty over Armenia before he is released.

 Roman Republic 
 The Roman playwright Terence's play Hecyra (The Mother-in-Law) is first performed.

Births 
 Sima Tan, Chinese astrologist and historian (approximate date)

Deaths 
 Mattathias, Jewish leader of the Maccabees
 Phraates I, king of Parthia (Arsacid Dynasty)

References